Lauro Ayestarán (Montevideo, 9 July 1913 – 22 July 1966, Montevideo) was a Uruguayan musicologist.

Selected works
Doménico Zipoli. El gran compositor y organista romano del 1700 en el Río de la Plata. (Museo Histórico Nacional. 1941)
Crónica de una temporada musical en el Montevideo de 1830 (Ediciones Ceibo. 1943)
Fuentes para el estudio de la música colonial uruguaya (Universidad de la República. 1947)
La música indígena en el Uruguay (Universidad de la República. 1949)
La primitiva poesía gauchesca en el Uruguay. Tomo 1 (El Siglo Ilustrado. 1950)
La misa para el día de difuntos de Fray Manuel Ubeda (Universidad de la República. 1952)
La música en el Uruguay. Tomo I (SODRE. 1953)
Virgilio Scarabelli (Monteverde. 1953)
Luis Sambucetti. Vida y obra (Museo Histórico Nacional. 1956)
El centenario del Teatro Solís (Comisión de Teatros Municipales. 1956)
La primera edición uruguaya del "Fausto" de Estanislao del Campo (Universidad de la República. 1959)
Presencia de la Música en Latinoamérica. La joven generación musical y sus problemas. (Universidad de la República. 1959)
Doménico Zipoli. Vida y obra (Museo Histórico Nacional. 1962)
El Minué Montonero (en colaboración con Flor de María Rodríguez. Ediciones de la Banda Oriental. 1965)
Cronología comparada de la historia del Uruguay 1830-1945 (with Blanca París de Oddone, Aurelio Lucchini, Otilia Muras, Arturo Ardao, Washington Buño, Carlos Real de Azúa, and Susana Salgado. 1966)

Posthumous
El folklore musical uruguayo (Arca. 1967)
Teoría y práctica del Folklore (Arca. 1968)
Cinco canciones folklóricas infantiles (Asociación de Educadores Musicales del Uruguay, 1969)
El Himno Nacional (Arca. 1974)
El candombe a través del tiempo (Fono-Música. 1983)
El tamboril y la comparsa (recopilación de sus textos por Flor de María Rodríguez y Alejandro Ayestarán. Arca. 1990)
Las músicas infantiles en el Uruguay (recopilación de sus textos por Flor de María Rodríguez y Alejandro Ayestarán. 1995)

References

External links
Lauro Ayestarán collection, 1830-1966 at the Library of Congress

See also
Flor de María Rodríguez (his wife and collaborator)

1913 births
1966 deaths
People from Montevideo
Uruguayan musicologists
Uruguayan folklorists
Uruguayan people of Basque descent
20th-century musicologists